The Livermore Sector of the Border Patrol was dismantled in 2004.  This was part of a shift of Border Patrol enforcement away from the interior and to the border.

The Livermore Sector's focus from 1950s - 1986 was on ranch and farm patrol, as these industries hired a high proportion of illegal aliens.  In 1986, Congress placed restrictions on ranch and farm enforcement operations by the Border Patrol.  Instead, the Border Patrol focused on worksite enforcement (also known as "employer sanctions") such as compliance with I-9 reporting requirements.  The Border Patrol's Livermore Sector also focused on responding to local police calls for assistance and transportation checks at bus and rail terminals.  The Border Patrol also checked county jail bookings for illegal aliens.

The Livermore Sector's stations were defined in 8 CFR 100.4 as follows: 

Livermore - Located inside Parks Reserve Forces Training Area in Dublin, CA (Closed); Duties transferred to San Francisco ICE/DRO.
Stockton - Located on Rough and Ready Island and still used by ICE/DRO.
Sacramento - 7000 Franklin Blvd, Ste 575, Sacramento CA 95823 (Closed); Duties transferred to Sacramento ICE/DRO located in downtown Sacramento.
Fresno - 4343 N Golden State Blvd, Fresno CA 93722 (Closed); Duties transferred to Fresno ICE/DRO at a location near Downtown Fresno.
Bakersfield - 4430 Easton Dr, Bakersfield CA 93309 (Closed); Duties transferred to Bakersfield ICE/DRO.
Salinas - Located on Harris Road 3/4 miles east of US 101, Salinas CA (Closed); Duties transferred to San Jose ICE/DRO.
Oxnard - Located at Camarillo Airport in Oxnard AFB Building 206 (Closed); Duties transferred to Ventura ICE/DRO.
San Luis Obispo - 1170 Calle Joaquin, San Luis Obispo CA 93405 (Closed); Duties transferred to Lompoc ICE/DRO.

The Livermore Sector also had an anti-smuggling unit (ASU) that comprised Special Agents from the Border Patrol.  

Today, many of the duties previously handled by the Border Patrol's Livermore Sector are now handled by the Detention and Removal Operations (DRO) branch of Immigration and Customs Enforcement (ICE).

Livermore Sector Border Patrol Agent killed in the line of duty
On September 6, 1989, at 1:45 a.m., Anti-Smuggling Agent Keith Connelly was shot by alien smugglers in the city of Fresno, California, where he died shortly thereafter. Agent Connelly was working an undercover operation accompanied by his partner, Ted Jordan, who was also shot but survived the ordeal. The Fresno, California Police Department responded to the emergency assistance call and apprehended the suspects who were turned over to the FBI for prosecution.   The Federal Law Enforcement Training Center (FLETC) for years had a Marksman Award that was named in honor of Agent Keith Connelly.

References

Border guards
Borders of the United States